Sir John Morgan was a Welsh nobleman.

Biography 
John Morgan was the father of Elizabeth Morgan (about 1474 – before 1501) from Tredegyr, Dyffryn, Monmouthshire, a descendant of Morgan ap Maredudd, who married John Clinton, 7th Baron Clinton, born in 1471 in Folkestone, Kent, England, died on 4 June 1514. John Clinton Fiennes, 7th Baron Clinton, was the son of Sir John Clinton, 6th Lord Clinton of Marstoke, and Elizabeth Fiennes, Lady Clinton, (b. c.1455).

John Morgan was created a Knight of the Holy Sepulchre (possibly c.1448). Later, when Henry Tudor was crowned King Henry VII it was of great benefit to the Morgans of Tredegar who were great supporters of Henry. Sir John received reward for his early support, and on 7 November 1485 he was appointed by the new king to the office of ‘Sheriff of Wentloog and Newport’ and made ‘Steward’ of the Machen Commote. His elevation to officer of the Tudor crown placed Sir John Morgan's influence and power at a new height. Around 1490, he commissioned the building of a new house at Tredegar. A wing of Sir John's stone manor house still exists. It is now the oldest part of the present day Tredegar House.

Honours 
 Knight of the Holy Sepulchre (1448).

See also 
 Tredegar House

Sources
tudorplace.com.ar

Welsh knights
Medieval Knights of the Holy Sepulchre